Elophila minima is a moth in the family Crambidae. It was described by David John Lawrence Agassiz in 2012. It is found in Ghana, Kenya, Nigeria, Sierra Leone, South Africa and Uganda.

The wingspan is 9–12 mm for males and 12–14 mm for females. Adults are sexually dimorphic. Males have white forewings with dark fuscous subbasal fascia. The hindwings have a dark fuscous subbasal fascia, a pale ochreous discal spot and a postmedian fascia. Females are darker and less strongly marked. Adults have been recorded on wing from January to March, in May, from July to August and from November to December.

Etymology
The species name refers to the small size of the species.

References

Acentropinae
Moths described in 2012
Moths of Africa